State Road 16 (NM 16) is a  state highway in the U.S. state of New Mexico. It runs from NM 22 near Pena Blanca to Interstate 25 (I-25)/ U.S. Route 85 (US 85).

Route description 
The route begins at an intersection with SR 22 north of Pena Blanca. From there, it heads southeastward through a desert landscape with the name of El Camino Real. Running through the Cochiti Indian Reservation, the road meets Dam Crest Road, which serves Cochiti Lake along the Rio Grande. At Tetilla Peak Road, the area south of the route becomes part of the Zia Indian Reservation. The route then crosses from Sandoval County into Santa Fe County. The route ends at an interchange with I-25.

Major intersections

See also

References

External links

 
 The Unofficial New Mexico Highways Page

016
Transportation in Sandoval County, New Mexico
Transportation in Santa Fe County, New Mexico